Philip Rogers may refer to:

 Sir Philip Rogers (businessman) (1908–1994), British businessman closely associated with Nigeria and Kenya
 Philip Hutchins Rogers (1794–1853), English marine and landscape painter
 Phil Rogers (born 1971), swimmer
 Phil Rogers (potter) (born 1951), Welsh studio potter
 Phil Rodgers (1938–2018), American golfer
 Philip Rogers (sailor) (1908–1961), Canadian Olympian
 Sir Philip Rogers (civil servant), English civil servant